Browder is an unincorporated community located in Muhlenberg County, Kentucky, United States.

History
A post office called Browder has been in operation since 1905. The community was named for W. F. Browder, a railroad official.

References

Unincorporated communities in Muhlenberg County, Kentucky
Unincorporated communities in Kentucky